Blepharomastix ineffectalis is a moth in the family Crambidae. It was described by Francis Walker in 1862. It is found in Brazil.

The wings are white, with fawn-colored basal, interior and exterior lines. The forewings are brownish on the costa and a slight fawn-colored tinge along the exterior border. The marginal points are brown.

References

Moths described in 1862
Blepharomastix